The 1943 Lehigh Engineers football team was an American football team that represented Lehigh University during the 1943 college football season. In its first season under head coach Leo Prendergast, the team compiled a 0–5–1 record, and lost all four games against its Middle Three Conference rivals.  

The team played its home games at Taylor Stadium in Bethlehem, Pennsylvania.

Schedule

References

Lehigh
Lehigh Mountain Hawks football seasons
College football winless seasons
Lehigh Engineers football